The 1927–28 Idaho Vandals men's basketball team represented the University of Idaho during the 1927–28 NCAA college basketball season. Members of the Pacific Coast Conference, the Vandals were led by first-year head coach  and played their home games on campus at the Armory and Gymnasium in Moscow, Idaho.

Head coach Dave MacMillan had departed for Minnesota in the summer, and was succeeded by alumnus Fox, who had coached Pocatello High School to the state title in 1927; he returned to Moscow and led the Vandals for nine seasons.

This was the final season for varsity basketball at the Armory and Gymnasium as the Memorial Gymnasium opened in November 1928. The older building became the women's gym, and continues today as the Art and Architecture South.

References

External links
Sports Reference – Idaho Vandals: 1927–28 basketball season
Gem of the Mountains: 1928 University of Idaho yearbook – 1927–28 basketball season
Idaho Argonaut – student newspaper – 1928 editions

Idaho Vandals men's basketball seasons
Idaho
Idaho
Idaho